Raymond Johnson Chapman (January 15, 1891 – August 17, 1920) was an American baseball player. He spent his entire career as a shortstop for the Cleveland Indians.

Chapman was hit in the head by a pitch thrown by pitcher Carl Mays and died 12 hours later. He is the only player to die directly from an injury received during a major league game. His death led baseball to establish a rule requiring umpires to replace the ball whenever it becomes dirty. Chapman's death and sanitary concerns also led to the ban on spitballs after the 1920 season. Chapman's death was also one of the examples cited to justify the wearing of batting helmets. However, it took over 30 years to adopt the rule that required their use.

Career
Chapman was born in Beaver Dam, Kentucky, and raised in Herrin, Illinois. He broke into the major leagues in 1912 with the Cleveland team, then known as the Naps.

Chapman led the American League in runs scored and walks in 1918. A top-notch bunter, Chapman is sixth on the all-time list for sacrifice hits and holds the single season record with 67 in 1917. Only Stuffy McInnis has more career sacrifices as a right-handed batter. Chapman was also an excellent shortstop who led the league in assists once. He batted .300 or better three times, and led the Indians in stolen bases four times. In 1917, he set a team record of 52 stolen bases, which stood until 1980. He was hitting .303 with 97 runs scored when he died. He was one of the few players whom Ty Cobb considered a friend.

There was conjecture that 1920 was going to be Chapman's last year as a pro baseball player. Shortly before the season began, Chapman married Kathleen Daly, who was the daughter of a prominent Cleveland businessman. Chapman had indicated he was going to retire to devote himself to the family business into which he was marrying, as well as to begin a family.

Death

On August 16, 1920, Chapman was struck in the head and killed by a pitch thrown by Carl Mays during a game against the New York Yankees at the Polo Grounds.<ref>{{cite news |url=https://books.google.com/books?id=MiwDAAAAMBAJ&pg=PA9 |title=Carl Mays: My Pitch That Killed Chapman Was A Strike! |last=Propert |first=Phyllis |work=Baseball Digest |date=July 1957 |volume=16 |number=6 |issn=0005-609X}}</ref>
At the time, pitchers commonly dirtied balls with soil, licorice, and tobacco juice, and scuffed, sandpapered, scarred, cut, or spiked them, giving a "misshapen, earth-colored ball that traveled through the air erratically, tended to soften in the later innings, and, as it came over the plate, was very hard to see."
Mays threw with a submarine delivery, and it was late afternoon. Eyewitnesses recounted that Chapman did not react to the pitch at all, presumably unable to see it. The sound of the ball striking Chapman's skull was so loud that Mays thought it had hit the end of Chapman's bat; he fielded the ball and threw to first base.

Home plate umpire Tommy Connolly, noticing that Chapman was bleeding from his left ear, screamed towards the stands for a doctor. Tris Speaker, who had been on deck, rushed to Chapman, as did several players from each team. Carl Mays merely stood on the mound.  Chapman tried to walk, but his knees buckled. As he was helped off the field by his teammates, he mumbled "I'm all right; tell Mays not to worry... ring....Katie's ring," before falling unconscious. Chapman was taken to St. Lawrence Hospital, a short distance from the Polo Grounds where he died about 4:40 AM from brain damage. His pregnant wife Katie, summoned from Cleveland by phone, arrived at 10:00 a.m. and fainted on learning he had died.

Thousands of mourners attended Chapman's funeral at the Cathedral of St. John the Evangelist in Cleveland and he was buried at Lake View Cemetery.

Cleveland players wore black armbands for the remainder of the season. The Indians won the 1920 World Series and dedicated their victory to Chapman.

Honors

A bronze plaque was designed in Chapman's memory, funded by donations from fans, was hung at League Park and was moved to Cleveland Stadium when the Indians moved there in 1946. Sometime in the early 1970s, however, it was removed for unknown reasons. In 2007 it was refurbished and made part of Progressive Field's Heritage Park, which includes the Cleveland Guardians Hall of Fame and other exhibits from the team's history. Chapman had been inducted into the team Hall of Fame in 2006, part of the first new induction class since 1972.
A baseball field is dedicated to Ray Chapman in his hometown of Beaver Dam, KY.

See also

 List of baseball players who died during their careers
 Phillip Hughes, Australian cricketer killed by a ball during play in 2014

References

Further reading
 Vigil, Vicki Blum (2007). Cemeteries of Northeast Ohio: Stones, Symbols & Stories. Cleveland, OH: Gray & Company, Publishers. 
 The book The Pitch That Killed, by Mike Sowell, is a history of the Chapman-Mays tragedy.
 The historical novel, The Curse of Carl Mays, by Howard Camerik, also recounts the Chapman-Mays incident.
 The Dan Gutman novel Ray & Me, tells the story of the Chapman incident with a fictional touch as the main character Joe Stoshack travels back in time to try to prevent his death.Do It for Chappie: The Ray Chapman Tragedy by Rick Swaine is a historical novel based on true events involving real-life historical figures.

External links

 The Death of Ray Chapman – New York Times'', August 18, 1920

1891 births
1920 deaths
Cleveland Indians players
Cleveland Naps players
Baseball players from Kentucky
Major League Baseball shortstops
Davenport Prodigals players
Springfield Senators players
Toledo Mud Hens players
People from Beaver Dam, Kentucky
People from Herrin, Illinois
Burials at Lake View Cemetery, Cleveland
Sports deaths in New York (state)
Baseball deaths
Deaths from head injury